PT Rajawali Corpora (RC) is an Indonesian holding company based in Jakarta, Indonesia. The corporation was formerly established in 1984 by Peter Sondakh as PT Rajawali Wira Bhakti Utama. Throughout the decades, Rajawali has developed into a regional player in several major business ventures and portfolios; ranging from Agriculture, Infrastructure, Information & Technology, Consumer Goods, Media & Communication, Mining & Resources, Property & Hotels, Retail, and Transportation Services.

In 2004, the chairman and CEO of Rajawali Corpora, Peter Sondakh, founded Rajawali Foundation (RF) as the philanthropic arm of Rajawali Corpora. The mission of RF is to promote peace, prosperity and the conservation of Indonesia's natural heritage through support for research, education and training. The foundation's emphasis on education reflects Mr. Sondakh's view that knowledge, skills and creativity are the true foundations of equitable and sustainable economic development.

Business units 
 PT Archi Indonesia Tbk
 PT Meares Soputan Mining
 PT Tambang Tondano Nusajaya
 PT Eagle High Plantations Tbk
 Fortune Indonesia
 PT Golden Eagle Energy Tbk
 PT Internasional Prima Coal
 PT Triaryani
 Indo Mines
 Rajawali Property Group
 Rajawali Place (under development)
 St. Regis Jakarta (under development)
 St. Regis Bali Resort
 St. Regis Langkawi
 Four Seasons Jakarta
 The Laguna Resort & Spa
 The Westin Langkawi
 Sheraton Senggigi Beach Resort
 Sheraton Imperial Hotel
 Novotel Lombok Resort
 Rajawali Televisi
 Velo Networks

Former companies 
 Rajawali Citra Televisi Indonesia (RCTI) 1987 - 2000
 PT Bank Pos Nusantara 1989 - 1999
 PT Express Transindo Utama Tbk (Express Group) 1989 - 2020
 Bentoel Group 1991 - 2009
 Metropolitan Retailmart (Metro Department Store) 1991 - 2000
 PT Excelcomindo Pratama (XL) 1995 - 2006
 PT Semen Gresik Tbk 2006 - 2010
 Nusantara Infrastructure 2010 - 2017

References

External links 
 

Conglomerate companies of Indonesia
Conglomerate companies established in 1984
1984 establishments in Indonesia